The SI-200 satellite bus was a model of satellite, based on the Malaysian RazakSAT, produced by the South Korean Satrec Initiative. The bus was suitable for small satellites where the accommodation of Earth observation or other scientific payloads is required, and was used on the Emirati remote sensing satellite DubaiSat-1 launched in 2009.

Features
 Three-axis stabilized, accurate and agile attitude control for precise imaging operations.
 Dual redundancies are adapted where necessary in the system architecture design to increase reliability of the satellite system.
 Dimensions: 1.2 m in diameter and 1.35 m in height.
 Deck-and-longeron type structure permitting easy assembly and disassembly. The interface with the launch vehicle is made through an adapter bolted to the bottom of the structure. The mechanical interface with the electro-optical payload is provided through three points at the satellite middle deck.

References

Satellite buses